The 2020 Illinois Republican presidential primary took place on March 18, 2020, as one of three contests scheduled on that date in the Republican Party presidential primaries for the 2020 presidential election.

Results

Incumbent United States President Donald Trump was challenged by businessman and perennial candidate Rocky De La Fuente of California. Trump won the state in a landslide victory over his opponent, which earned him enough delegates to secure the Republican party's nomination. Rocky De La Fuente's 4% share of the vote was his third-best performance of any state, after Delaware and Connecticut.

See also
 2020 United States presidential election in Illinois

References

Illinois Republican
Republican primary
Illinois Republican primaries